Irena Spasić is a Serbian computer scientist specializing in text mining of biomedical information, with applications including exometabolomics. She is a professor of computer science and informatics at Cardiff University, director of the Cardiff University Data Innovation Research Institute, chief scientist for AI development at IPwe, and since 2020 a Fellow of the Learned Society of Wales.

Spasić is a graduate of the University of Belgrade and earned her Ph.D. in computer science at the University of Salford. She was a postdoctoral researcher at the University of Manchester before taking her present position in Cardiff.

References

External links
Home page

Year of birth missing (living people)
Living people
Serbian computer scientists
Women computer scientists
University of Belgrade alumni
Alumni of the University of Salford
Academics of Cardiff University
Fellows of the Learned Society of Wales